Wadadah F.C. (means Peace and Love) is a Jamaican football team playing at the second level, the Western Confederation Super League.

History
The club began in 1983 when it entered the St. James Division in Division II. In its first year it won Division II and was promoted to Division I (which was the highest league a club could play in at that time).

Wadadah was relegated to the second tier of Jamaican football after finishing the 2006–2007 season in 11th place.

Achievements
Jamaica National Premier League: 2
 1988, 1992

References

Football clubs in Jamaica
1983 establishments in Jamaica
Association football clubs established in 1983